Charles de Bourbon (2 June 1489 – 25 March 1537) was a French prince du sang and military commander at the court of Francis I of France.

Biography

Charles was born at the Château de Vendôme, eldest son of Francis de Bourbon, Count of Vendôme and Marie of Luxembourg.

Charles succeeded his father as Count of Vendôme in 1495. Charles's first military service was in Italy, under King Louis XII of France. In 1514, he was created Duke of Vendôme when the county of Vendôme was elevated into a duchy. He fought at the Battle of Marignano (1515) and participated in the Flemish campaign. Because of his loyalty to the King, he was appointed head of the council when King Francis I was captured at the Battle of Pavia.

Marriage and issue
On 18 May 1513, Charles married Françoise d'Alençon, eldest daughter of René, Duke of Alençon and Margaret of Lorraine. They had:
 Louis de Bourbon (1514–1516), died in infancy.
 Marie de Bourbon (1515–1538), unmarried, prospective bride of King James V of Scotland in 1536.
 Marguerite de Bourbon (1516–1559), married in 1538, Francis I, Duke of Nevers (1516–1561)
 Antoine de Bourbon, Duke of Vendôme (1518–1562), King of Navarre through his marriage (jure uxoris) to Queen Jeanne III.
 François de Bourbon, Count of Enghien (1519–1546), unmarried.
 Madeleine de Bourbon (1521–1561), Abbess of Sainte-Croix de Poitiers.
 Louis de Bourbon (1522–1525), died in infancy.
 Charles de Bourbon (1523–1590), Archbishop of Rouen
 Catherine de Bourbon (1525–1594), Abbess of Soissons.
 Renée de Bourbon (1527–1583), Abbess of Chelles.
 Jean de Bourbon, Count of Soissons and Enghien (1528–1557), married in 1557, his first cousin, Marie, Duchess of Estouteville (1539–1601)
 Louis I de Bourbon, Prince of Condé (1530–1569), married Eléonore de Roye, daughter of Charles de Roye, Count of Royce.
 Léonore de Bourbon (1532–1611), Abbess of Fontevraud.

Ancestors

References

Sources

1489 births
1537 deaths
15th-century French people
16th-century French people
16th-century French military personnel
House of Bourbon-La Marche
House of Bourbon
House of Bourbon (France)
Dukes of Vendôme
Counts of Soissons
Counts of Vendôme
People from Vendôme
People of the Italian Wars